Rockstar is a 2011 Indian Hindi-language musical romantic drama film written and directed by Imtiaz Ali and produced by former Eros International head Sunil Lulla and Shree Ashtavinayak Cine Vision chief Dhilin Mehta, starring Ranbir Kapoor and Nargis Fakhri with music composed by A. R. Rahman. The film also features Moufid Aziz, Aditi Rao Hydari, Piyush Mishra, Shernaz Patel, Kumud Mishra in supporting roles, and also Ranbir Kapoor's granduncle Shammi Kapoor, who makes his posthumous silver-screen appearance following his death on 14 August 2011.

Rockstar was released on 11 November 2011. On the day of release, Tibetans in Chennai and Kangra protested against the Central Board of Film Certification asking the film-makers to censor scenes featuring the Tibetan flag. Upon release, Rockstar received generally mixed-to-positive reviews, with high praise directed towards Kapoor's performance and Rahman's soundtrack, but received criticism for its story and screenplay. It was one of the top-grossing films of that year, managing to appeal the youngsters in the cities.
The album of the film is often termed as the best music album of the decade. 

At the 57th Filmfare Awards, Rockstar received 10 nominations, including Best Film, Best Director (Ali) and Best Female Debut (Fakhri), and won 5 awards, including Best Actor (Ranbir Kapoor) and Best Music Director (Rahman). Over the years, the film has gone to achieve a cult following.

Plot
A large crowd gathers outside the Verona Arena in Italy to watch the performance of rockstar Jordan. Despite being mobbed, he storms onto the stage in a fit of rage and starts strumming his guitar.

A flashback reveals the story of Jordan, whose real name is Janardhan Jakhar  JJ, a Jat boy from Delhi. He is studying at Hindu College and dreams of being a rockstar like Jim Morrison, for which he is often laughed at by his friends. Khatana, the canteen owner, tells JJ that one thing common among all artists is a life-altering heartbreak. JJ jokingly tells himself that since that hasn't happened yet, he won't be able to reach his idol's status. He watches the dance performance of Heer Kaul, a beautiful girl from St. Stephen's College during a contest, and overhears that she is the "perfect-heartbreaking-machine". Remembering Khatana's words, he decides to propose to her but suffers humiliation, which he sees as the perfect method for enduring the heartbreak needed for stardom. Over time, he and Heer become good friends, often going on adventures and engaging in risky behavior.

Heer marries a man named Jai in Kashmir, after which the couple moves to Prague. During this time, she develops feelings for JJ and coins the nickname "Jordan" for him. JJ finds himself thrown out by his brothers for allegedly stealing family money. He takes refuge for two months in the nearby Nizamuddin Dargah, singing qawwalis, and then moves into Khatana's home. Ustaad Jameel Khan, a renowned classical musician, hears JJ's singing at the Dargah and prompts Dhingra, the owner of "Platinum Records," to sign him. Sheena, a journalist, interviews JJ and hints to him that Dhingra is sending artists to Prague for a Europe tour. JJ volunteers to work there, in the hopes of reuniting with Heer.

Heer, meanwhile, suffers from continuous health problems. She meets JJ in Prague and they reconnect, but when he tries to profess his love for her, Heer, being married, spurns him. Despite this, their relationship gets intimate, and Heer feels guilty. As soon as JJ's Prague tours are over, she leaves him. JJ tries to visit her one last time before departing to India but is arrested on trespassing charges filed by Heer's husband. While JJ is being taken away, he sees Heer collapse. Upon being deported back to India, he is overwhelmed by the attention he receives, and clashes with the media and the Indian police, resulting in a jail term. The event garners enough publicity to make Dhingra decide to release JJ's recordings; the album does well, throwing JJ into the limelight.

After being released, JJ terminates his contract with Dhingra, embarks on a country-wide tour, and finally morphs fully into "Jordan", the rockstar he had aspired to be. He turns bitter, arrogant, and lonely as time goes on, but remains a highly popular artist.

Jordan meets Heer's younger sister, Mandy, during one of his concerts, and she asks him to help Heer, who has been diagnosed with aplastic anaemia. Jordan's presence causes Heer to somewhat recover and her blood level rise. He starts disregarding his musical obligations to spend more time with her, and Khatana, his manager now, asks Heer to persuade Jordan to attend his concerts. Heer does so, and JJ resumes his tour with his first concert at Kangra, Himachal Pradesh. Upon returning, Heer's health deteriorates again. She slips into a coma and is discovered to be pregnant with Jordan's child. When Mandy informs Jordan of Heer's condition, he leaves one of his shows midway and goes to her hospital bed. He tries to wake her up but she remains non-responsive. Jordan realizes that she will not survive and goes numb. Heer dies offscreen, leaving Jordan in a permanent state of grief, who finally achieves international stardom like his idol.

The film cuts back to the concert in Verona and while performing, Jordan sees a vision of a smiling Heer walking towards him. The film ends with a line from the poet Rumi's poem; translated, it means: "Away, beyond all concepts of wrong-doing and right-doing, there is a field. I'll meet you there", which the film began with.

Cast
 Ranbir Kapoor as Janardhan "Jordan" Jakhar(JJ)
Mohit Chauhan as Jordan's singing voice (Voice only)
 Nargis Fakhri as Heer Kaul
 Aditi Rao Hydari as Sheena
 Kumud Mishra as Khatana
 Piyush Mishra as Dhingra
 Moufid Aziz as Jai
 Shammi Kapoor as Ustad Jameel Khan
 Shernaz Patel as Neena Kaul
 Aakash Dahiya as Jordan's friend
 Jaideep Ahlawat as Jordan's brother
 Shreya Narayan as Jordan's sister-in-law
 Nizami Bandhu as Qawwal from Nizamuddin Auliya Dargah
 Sanjana Sanghi as Mandy Kaul, Heer's younger sister

Production

Casting
Ranbir Kapoor plays the male lead of Rockstar, with whom Eros International worked previously on Anjaana Anjaani. His role of Jordan is loosely based on Imtiaz Ali's Jat friend, who lived in a small settlement in Pitam Pura. He had seen Kareena Kapoor's performance in his Jab We Met and wanted to cast her in the film. However, the script required some romantic scenes between the leads. As Ranbir and Kareena happened to be cousins, this was touted as a problem. Moreover, the filmmakers did not want to replace Ranbir with any other actor as the character he portrayed was reportedly suitable only for him. They then made a joint decision to replace Kapoor with Nargis Fakhri, after initially approaching Sonam Kapoor and Diana Penty for the replacement. The film marked Shammi Kapoor's last appearance in a feature film; he died on 14 August 2011.

Filming

The shooting for Rockstar began in May 2010. A major part of the shooting took place in Kashmir at Kulgam, Kupwara , Pahalgam and Srinagar, while the last phase was shot in Delhi at places like the Kotla Mubarakpur, Nizamuddin Dargah, Greater Kailash, Munirka, Indira Gandhi International Airport, Amity School (deleted scenes),
Connaught Place,  Shri Ram College of Commerce, BL Kapoor Hospital, Rajendra Nagar, St. Stephen's College and Hindu College, which was Imtiaz Ali's alma mater.

Foreign sequences were shot at Wenceslas Square, Charles Bridge and the Old Town in parts of Prague and in Liberec (at Dr. Beneš Square, in front of the Liebieg Villa). The film was shot in reverse as the crew didn't want to break the continuity of Ranbir's hairstyle. The climax with long hair was shot first. Kapoor had to transform himself into a rockstar: he practiced guitar at A. R. Rahman's studio in Chennai for many days, read Kurt Cobain's biography and familiarised himself with Jats.

Rockstar'''s costumes were designed by Aki Narula and Manish Malhotra, who dressed Ranbir in "small-town denim-and-sweater combination and later, Pathani-style kurtas with arm bands", thus completing the rockstar look. Nargis Fakhri, who plays the role of a Kashmiri Pandit girl, wore a traditional Kashmiri Pandit wedding outfit in the wedding scene, which included Pandit Pheran, Dejhor (ear ornament) and Taranga (head cap worn underneath the veil). This also happens to be the first time in Bollywood that a Kashmiri Pandit wedding was shown.

Soundtrack

The music for the film is composed and scored by A. R. Rahman. This also marks the first Imtiaz Ali film since his debut Socha Na Tha, to have the same composer for both film score and songs.

The soundtrack features 14 tracks, with all lyrics penned by Irshad Kamil. The recording of the album took place in Chennai, London and Mumbai. Mohit Chauhan had lent his voice for nine songs. The audio rights were bought by T-Series. Upon release on 30 September 2011, it received highly positive reviews from critics. "Sadda Haq" became the most popular song of the album and was named as a "youth anthem".

ReleaseRockstar released on 11 November 2011 and saw a good advance opening at multiplexes closer to educational institutions. The film released in 2,500 screens, and saw cinema halls running 14 to 15 shows in a day.

 Reception 
Critical response
Raja Sen of Rediff gave the film 4 stars out of 5 and wrote, "Rockstar is a simple, unspectacular tale, sometimes even predictable, but director Imtiaz Ali masterfully weaves in details that draw us in." Aniruddha Guha of DNA too gave the film 4 out of 5 saying that the film was "like an effective crescendo that leaves you wanting more." Nikhat Kazmi of The Times of India also gave the film 4 out of 5 and stated that "The highpoint of Rockstar is its high tension, high-on-passion romance between two unlikely people". Sukanya Verma of Rediff rated it 3.5 stars out of 5 and said, "Rockstar is flawed but fabulous." Mayank Shekhar of Hindustan Times also gave a rating of 3.5 out of 5 and noted "The canvas is wide like early Sanjay Leela Bhansali's; bird's view of the stunning bridge is very Mani Ratnam; witty, earthy dialogues are so Vishal Bhardwaj. Director Imitiaz Ali manages to retain a personal, auteur's touch in a genre vastly commercial, mainstream. This is a rare feat." Taran Adarsh of Bollywood Hungama gave the film 3 out of 5 stars, and said "On the whole, Rockstar does not live up to the confidence and expectations from the otherwise very skilled and accomplished film-maker Imtiaz Ali." Hrithik Sharma of El Viaje Reviews included it into his select list of Bollywood classics and says that "Rockstar is a unique cocktail of 50% drama, 40% romance and 10% comedy. What stands out is the music by A. R. Rahman. Each song in the film is a masterpiece and fits very well into the plot. Cinematography is realistic but pre-possessing indeed. The film gets a 10 on 10 in this department. There are certain scenes in the film that may seem unrelated to the plot but those would be the scenes that would stay with you longer." Rajeev Masand of CNN-IBN also gave 3 stars out of 5, commenting "Imtiaz Ali's Rockstar is a far-from-perfect film, but it has honesty and depth, which is mostly missing in Hindi movies today."

Sumit Bhattacharya of Rediff gave a rating of 2.5 out of 5, saying that "Rockstar is what is called a one-time watch", and highlighted that the film "is more Devdas than Jim Morrison". Saibal Chatterjee of NDTV too gave the film 2.5 out of 5 stars, and said "Rockstar has a Sufi soul. If only it had been set free and allowed to go the whole hog!" Komal Nahta of Koimoi again gave the film 2.5 out of 5, and said, "Rockstar will meet with a mixed response: one section of the audience (mainly youngsters in the cities) will love it while another section (mainly the single-screen audience and public of smaller cities) will find it ordinary." Kaveree Bamzai of India Today gave the film 2 out of 5 stars and said "AR Rahman's music is the soul of the film. What is missing is the spine, leaving just a jelly in place." Yahoo! gave the film 1 star out of 5, and said "Rockstar drives home an unscientific hypothesis that people who’ve endured sufferings/heart break etc will reach their creative best." A reviewer from Reuters commented that Rahman and Kapoor are the stars of the film while saying "Rockstar works on so many levels, but it fails miserably on so many more.". Anuj Kumar of The Hindu said "Imtiaz Ali's latest is yet another good-looking product where a promising new-age director fails to translate his thought into something convincing."

Controversy
Major parts of the song "Sadda Haq" were shot at the Norbulingka monastery in McLeod Ganj, Dharamsala and people waving the free Tibet flag in the backdrop were shown in the song video. This triggered a dispute between Central Board of Film Certification and Imtiaz Ali when the Board asked Ali to blur the flag before the film hit theatres, but the director refused to do it. Imtiaz Ali said, "I am not concerned at all. I have been out of India for long and don’t know what is going on, but I don’t see anything controversial in the intention portrayal in the movie. The purpose of the movie is not to make any social message, its more about personal freedom rather than a geographical issue." However, he had to remove the sequence from the video to get the film's censor done. Later an official from the Board stated: "The Censor Board chief explained to them that all the cuts were made by the director voluntarily, and he had the option of appealing to a review board which he didn’t do. There were certain discussions between (Imtiaz) Ali and the Board regarding retaining a kiss between two actors (Kapoor and Fakhri), but there has been no disagreement regarding deleting the flag from the frames." The controversy sparked protests among the Tibetan diaspora in Dharamsala and Chennai. Later television broadcasts blotted out a "Free Tibet" banner featured in the song.

Box office

Domestic
Upon release, Rockstar had a very good opening. The film opened to a good response at multiplexes with bookings averaging around 60–70%, and single screens witnessed a lower capacity at around 30–40%.
It collected  nett on its opening day, thus becoming the second highest opener in a non-festival season after Ready. The good opening was attributed to the multiplexes across cities, the "star power" of Ranbir Kapoor as well as the youthful theme of the film. A similar growth was seen on Sunday, and hence the first weekend collection ended at  nett, the majority of which was collected from Mumbai, Pune, Delhi and Bangalore.Rockstar opened well on Monday collecting around  nett, with 40% drop as compared to the first day collections, thus taking the four-day total to  nett. The film collection saw another noticeable fall on Tuesday as it collected around  nett, with five days collection totalling to  nett. At the end of first week, the film had a good collection by grossing  nett, though the film had found appreciation only with a small section of the audience. In the process, it was ranked ninth in the list of all-time first week domestic collections.Rockstar grossed  nett on second Friday, with a 75% drop as compared to the first day. As of ten days, the film had collected approximately  nett. Rockstar made  nett in the second week, declining by 67% and taking the two-week collection totalled at  nett. By the end of its fifth week, the film netted .

InternationalRockstar'' managed to gross $3.3 million from all overseas markets overall and was termed as below the mark. The film collected £ in the UK$,  in North America$,  in UAE and $ in Australia.

Accolades

See also

Sufi rock
Sufi music

References

External links
 
 
 
 

Films set in Delhi
2011 films
2010s Hindi-language films
Indian romantic musical films
Indian rock music films
Films directed by Imtiaz Ali
Films shot in the Czech Republic
2010s romantic musical films
2011 romantic drama films
Indian romantic drama films
Films set in Jammu and Kashmir
Indian nonlinear narrative films
Films scored by A. R. Rahman